Bayingyi people also known as Luso-Burmese, are a subgroup ethnicity of Luso-Asians, and are the descendants of Portuguese mercenaries or adventurers who came to Myanmar (Burma) in the 16th and 17th centuries. They were recruited into the Royal Burmese Armed forces' artillery and musketeers corps, and over centuries of continued settlement in the Mu Valley, particularly the Sagaing Region of Myanmar, have been more or less assimilated into the dominant ethnic group of the region, the Bamar, while keeping their sense of Portuguese identity and Roman Catholic religion.

Etymology 
The descendants of the Portuguese were once commonly known, because of their Caucasian features, as “Bayingyi", but the everyday usage of the term, along with the Bayingyi's European appearance, has almost disappeared due to assimilation with the Bamar. The term “Bayingyi” is derived from the Arabic expression ‘Feringhi’ or 'Frank', used to generally describe any western European, with the word mainly being used by Middle Eastern Muslims to describe the Christian invaders from Europe during the Crusades.

History

Arrival of the Portuguese 
During the 16th and 17th centuries the Royal Burmese Armed forces recruited entire corps of European and Muslim mercenaries, who used knowledge of artillery and muskets to assist the Burmese in war. By the mid-17th century,  the mercenaries, who had proven politically dangerous as well as expensive, had virtually disappeared in favour of cannoneers and matchlockmen in the Burmese military ahmudan system. However, the men who replaced the mercenaries were themselves descendants of the mercenaries who had settled in their own hereditary villages in Upper Burma (on the vast plain in Sagaing Region) where they practised their own religion (Roman Catholicism) and followed their own customs.

Filipe de Brito e Nicote and the development of the Bayingyi identity 

One of the best-known Portuguese adventurers was Filipe de Brito e Nicote, who served the Rakhine king, Min Razagyi. In 1599, de Brito was made governor of Syriam, a busy port on the Bago River in what is now Yangon’s Thanlyin Township, where the ruins of the country’s first Catholic church can be seen on a hilltop.

De Brito, who commanded a force of about 3,000 men, enraged the Burmese after his forces desecrated Buddha images, and in 1613 Syriam was attacked by the Taungoo dynasty king, Anaukpetlun. De Brito was captured and executed by impaling. The Portuguese community, between 4,000 and 5,000 people, was taken prisoner and marched to the Taungoo capital, Ava. Some sources say it took them 10 weeks to complete the journey.

In 1628, Anaukpetlun was succeeded by King Thalun. He encouraged the Portuguese and their mixed-race families to integrate, and gave them the land where their ancestors live in Sagaing. Now the descendants of these Portuguese, heavily integrated both ethnically and culturally into the Bamar, live scattered across an unknown range of villages and towns in this region known as 'Anya'.

Population 

An 1830 census put the population of the Bayingyi at somewhere roughly around 3,000, but it is entirely possible many thousands more have some Portuguese ancestry - at least 5,000 Portuguese adventurers and mercenaries came to and settled in Myanmar. Centuries of inter-marriage have left the Bayingyi more or less assimilated into the Bamar ethnic group of Myanmar, but they have still kept their sense of Portuguese identity and Roman Catholic Religion, and in some individuals obvious European phenotypes are still present.

See also 

 Luso-Asians
Luso-Indians
Anglo-Burmese
 Portuguese people
 Ethnic groups of Myanmar
 Felipe de Brito e Nicote
 Roman Catholicism in Myanmar

References 

Ethnic groups in Myanmar
Portuguese diaspora in Asia